How to Find a Husband is a Kenyan comedy-drama television series that made its debut on 3 March 2015. It stars Lizz Njagah, Sarah Hassan and Mumbi Maina. The story mainly features romance as its primary theme.

Sally Grey, a 37-year-old TV presenter tries to find her future husband on different dates and sets out to find her Mr. Right in 10 weeks.

Premise
Abigail, Carol and Jackie are three middle-class Kenyan women traversing the entrepreneurial and social scenes of Nairobi. Abigail (Lizz Njagah) is an assertive woman who owns her own business but is susceptible to insecurities from her tumultuous past, involving heartache and a search for the right man. Her cousin Jackie (Mumbi Maina) is a more liberal and experimental woman enjoying the attention of her middle-aged years and less wary of what the future holds. Carol (Sarah Hassan), on the other hand, may come across as slightly dimwitted, but it’s evident that it's a façade, enabling her to easily manipulate her way into getting what she wants.

Cast

Regular cast
Lizz Njagah as Abigail 
Mumbi Maina as Jackie
Sarah Hassan as Carol 
Nice Githinji
Nana Gichuru
Neville Misati as Nelson 
Lenana Kariba
Joe Kinyua
Joed Ngaruiya as Robert
Martin Githinji as David
Irene Njuguna as Patricia

Production
The show is produced by Erica Anyadike, a Tanzanian producer based in Kenya. The script writers are; Abigail Arunga, Benson Njuguna, Jacque Ndinda, Clifton Gachugua, Voline Ogutu, Njihia Mbitiru and Jacque Ndinda.

Broadcast
How To Find a Husband  premiered in syndicate channel Maisha Magic on 3 March 2015.

Awards and nominations

2016 Africa Magic Viewer's choice Awards

References

2015 Kenyan television series debuts
Kenyan comedy television series
English-language television shows
Kenyan television soap operas
2010s Kenyan television series